Phyprosopus is a genus of moths of the family Erebidae. The genus was erected by Augustus Radcliffe Grote in 1872.

Species
Phyprosopus albigutta (Herrich-Schäffer, 1868) Cuba
Phyprosopus calligrapha Hampson, 1926 Texas in the US
Phyprosopus callitrichoides Grote, 1872 New York to Texas in the US
Phyprosopus ergodan (Dyar, 1921) Guatemala
Phyprosopus fastigiata (Herrich-Schäffer, 1868) Cuba
Phyprosopus intertribulus (Dyar, 1921) Cuba
Phyprosopus pardan (Dyar, 1921) Cuba
Phyprosopus parthenope (Schaus, 1913) Costa Rica
Phyprosopus tristriga (Herrich-Schäffer, 1868) Cuba

References

Catocalinae
Moth genera